I Tell It Like It Used to Be is the debut studio album by American country music artist T. Graham Brown. It was released in 1986 via Capitol Nashville. The album includes the singles "I Tell It Like It Used to Be", "I Wish That I Could Hurt That Way Again", "Hell and High Water" and "Don't Go to Strangers".

Track listing

Chart performance

References

1986 debut albums
T. Graham Brown albums
Capitol Records Nashville albums